Kaweah Queen is a mountain along Kaweah peaks ridge which forms part of the Great Western Divide in the Sierra Nevada. The peak is in California's Sequoia National Park.

References

External links 
 

Mountains of Sequoia National Park
Mountains of Tulare County, California
Mountains of Northern California